Pedro de Roxas Acevedo (c. 1594-1670s) was a Spanish military officer, and politician, who served in Buenos Aires and Asunción holding honorary positions, including the post of Governor of the Río de la Plata and Paraguay, on an interim term between January 8, 1641, to July 17, 1641.

Biography 
He was born in Garachico (Tenerife, Spain), son of Amador de Acevedo and Catalina de Roxas, natives of Madrid. He had arrived at the Río de la Plata from Cádiz in 1612. After establishing himself in the city, he held the post of notary public of the  Cabildo of Buenos Aires in 1620. 

He was elected alcalde in second vote in 1626, and also served as regidor of the Ayuntamiento. In 1641, Roxas was appointed as lieutenant governor of Buenos Aires, being designated that same year to occupy of interim form the governorship of the Río de la Plata.

Pedro de Roxas Acevedo was married to doña María de Vega, daughter of Diego de Vega and Blanca de Vasconcelos. His sons, Thomas de Roxas and Amador de Roxas, were two important political officials of the 17th century . He and his family received very large land grants in Buenos Aires, being considered one of the richest men of his time.

References

External links 
www.gob.gba.gov.ar

People from Tenerife
17th-century Spanish nobility
Spanish generals
Spanish colonial governors and administrators
Mayors of Buenos Aires
Spanish notaries
Río de la Plata
1590s births
1670s deaths